Kramer House may refer to:

in the United States (by state)
Kramer House (Los Angeles), California, a Los Angeles Historic-Cultural Monument in the San Fernando Valley
Kramer House (Evansville, Indiana), listed on the National Register of Historic Places in Vanderburgh County, Indiana
Frank A. and Rae E. Harris Kramer House, Gaylord, Michigan, NRHP-listed
Kramer House (Florissant, Missouri), listed on the National Register of Historic Places in St. Louis County, Missouri